Michaël Jérémiasz and Shingo Kunieda defeated Stefan Olsson and Adam Kellerman in the final, 6–0, 6–1 to win the men's doubles wheelchair tennis title at the 2013 Australian Open. With the win, Jérémaisz completed the career Super Slam.

Robin Ammerlaan and Ronald Vink were the reigning champions, but Ammerlaan did not participate. Vink partnered Stéphane Houdet, but was defeated by Olsson and Kellerman in the semifinals.

The 2013 Australian Open – Wheelchair men's doubles was a tennis tournament featuring 8 paraplegic men tennis players, which was part of the NEC Tour. The tournament took place at Melbourne Park in Melbourne, Australia, from 25 January to 28 January 2012. It was the 10th edition of the Australian Open men's wheelchair event and the first Grand Slam event of 2013. The tournament was played on Plexicushion Prestige AO hard courts, which was rated a medium-fast pace by the ITF. The competition was organised by the International Tennis Federation and Tennis Australia.

Seeds
  Stéphane Houdet /  Ronald Vink (semifinals)
   Michaël Jérémiasz /  Shingo Kunieda (champions)

Draw

Finals

External links
 Main Draw

Wheelchair Men's Doubles
2013 Men's Doubles